Neelagunda is a village in the Harapanahalli Taluka of Vijayanagara district in Karnataka state, India.

Importance
Neelagunda is famous for the Bheemeshwara Temple of the Western Chalukya era.

See also

 Harihara
 Harapanahalli
 Vijayanagara
 Karnataka

References

Villages in Vijayanagara district
History of Karnataka
Archaeological sites in Karnataka